The Irvine Police Department is the local law enforcement agency of the city of Irvine, California, United States.

It also supplements the jurisdiction of the University of California, Irvine, Police Department, whose jurisdiction includes the University of California, Irvine campus and surrounding areas of the city.

History

Law enforcement in Irvine

The earliest organized law enforcement in what is today the city of Irvine, would have dated back to California's entry as a US state in 1850. At this time, the area today known as Orange County was still a part of Los Angeles County. The Los Angeles Sheriff's Department was responsible for law enforcement to all areas of the county at that time. In the mid-19th century, due to the levels of lawlessness in the southern counties of California, the governor created the Los Angeles Rangers, a mounted volunteer cavalry unit that supplemented law enforcement in Southern California. This unit was dissolved by the 1860s.

By 1889, the area today known as Orange County was allowed by the state of California to break away from Los Angeles County. The Irvine Ranch (run first by the Irvine Family, later by the Irvine Company and Irvine Foundation) also had its own Special Deputies (peace officers), authorized by the Orange County Sheriff.

The city of Irvine was originally developed as a master planned community by the Irvine Company, working in conjunction with the state that also built the University of California, Irvine during the early 1960s.

The City of Irvine incorporated in 1971 following a popular vote by the people of the community.  For the first year of the city's existence, the city contracted with the Orange County Sheriff's Department to continue law enforcement service to the formerly unincorporated county area, following the Lakewood/ Los Angeles Sheriff's Model from 1954.

In 1972, the city of Irvine changed their contract law enforcement agency to the Costa Mesa Police Department, that provided contract police service until 1975, this time following the Brea Police/Yorba Linda model. During that period, officers from Costa Mesa Police would work the Irvine contract, wearing their Costa Mesa uniforms, but with a patch denoting their assignment to Irvine, under their normal Costa Mesa uniform shoulder patches.  These officers used marked Costa Mesa patrol units, albeit with the Irvine city seal in place of the Costa Mesa city seal on the doors.

Irvine Police Department

The Irvine Police Department was founded in 1975. Much of its original membership came from officers that formerly had worked the Irvine area under the four-year contract with the Costa Mesa Police Department. In July 2017 the department created a mounted unit.

Rank structure

Chiefs

Leo Peart
Charles Brobeck
Michael Berkow
Dave Maggard
Mike Hamel
Michael Kent

Vehicles

Even after breaking away from Costa Mesa, the Irvine Police marked units continued to carry the distinct "all white" paint schemes for their cars, with a set of a green and a blue "racing stripes" running the length of the car on the driver's side, from front to back. Until January 2019, Irvine units were white and had a distinct blue stripe running the length of the car with a city seal at the front and the words "Irvine Police" printed on it. The department switched to the traditional "black and white" units. The new graphics contained the city logo at the front, a thin blue line stretching across the doors, and the words "City of Irvine" above the blue line and "POLICE" below it. The non sworn employee vehicles remained white but received the new graphics.

See also

 List of law enforcement agencies in California

References

External links
Irvine Police Department 
Geographic Area - Crossroads 
Geographic Area - Portola 
Geographic Area - University 

Organizations based in Irvine, California
Emergency services in Orange County, California
Municipal police departments of California
Government agencies established in 1975
1975 establishments in California